Asene Akroso-Manso is one of the constituencies represented in the Parliament of Ghana. It elects one Member of Parliament (MP) by the first past the post system of election.  Asene Akroso-Manso was one of the constituencies created before the 2012 general elections in Ghana.

Boundaries
The seat is located entirely within the Birim Central Municipal Assembly of the Eastern Region of Ghana.

Members of Parliament

See also
List of Ghana Parliament constituencies
Birim Central Municipal District

References

Parliamentary constituencies in the Eastern Region (Ghana)